Leistarcha is a genus of moths of the family Xyloryctidae.

Species
 Leistarcha amphigramma (Meyrick, 1915)
 Leistarcha scitissimella (Walker, 1864)
 Leistarcha tenuistria (Turner, 1935)
 Leistarcha thaumastica (Turner, 1946)

References

 
Xyloryctidae
Xyloryctidae genera